Scantlin is a surname. Notable people with the surname include:

Melana Scantlin (born 1977), American television host, writer, and beauty pageant winner
Wes Scantlin (born 1972), American singer-songwriter and musician

See also
Scantling (surname)